Danville, Maryland may refer to:
Danville, Allegany County, Maryland, an unincorporated community in Allegany County
Danville, Prince George's County, Maryland, an unincorporated community in Prince George's County